The 2016–17 season was Leeds United's seventh consecutive season in the Championship. Along with competing in the Championship, the club also participated in the FA Cup and EFL Cup.

The season covers the period from 1 July 2016 to 30 June 2017.

Review
Since returning to the Championship in 2010, most of Leeds' seasons had seen mid-table mediocrity, with occasional struggles against relegation, and very few promotion challenges. This season, however, would mark the point where they began to turn the corner. Former Swansea City manager Garry Monk took over as Leeds manager, and enjoyed a less-than-auspicious start, losing four of his first six matches in charge. Owner Massimo Cellino nearly sacked Monk, but having seen precious little success with his strategy of chopping and changing managers over the past three years, decided to give him longer. 

Cellino was rewarded for his patience when Leeds' form dramatically improved thereafter, with a strong run of form taking them into the play-off places by early November, and even challenging for automatic promotion by the turn of the year, with the goals of Chris Wood, who had already impressed in the previous season, being crucial to their promotion challenge. While they remained in the play-off places until the final weeks of the seasons, an injury crisis combined with a barren spell for Wood saw the promotion challenge slowly unravel. They ultimately finished in 7th place with 75 points; in many seasons this would have been good enough for a play-off spot, but an exceptionally strong top six meant Leeds ultimately came nowhere close to securing a spot. Still, the season still marked only the third time since relegation from the Premier League in 2004 that Leeds had finished in the top half of the Championship.

Off the pitch, the season saw Cellino wind down his interest in the club, selling half of his shares to compatriot Andrea Radrizzani in January, before selling him the remainder after the season ended.

First team squad 

 

Appearances (starts and substitute appearances) and goals include those in the Championship (and playoffs), League One (and playoffs), FA Cup, EFL Cup and EFL Trophy.

Transfers

In

Loans in

Loans out

Transfers out

New contracts

Pre-season

Competitions

Overall summary

Last updated: 7 May 2017

Championship

League table

Results summary

Results by matchday

Matches

FA Cup

EFL Cup

Statistics

Appearances and goals

|-
|colspan="14"|Players currently out on loan:

|-
|colspan="17"|Players who have been available for selection this season, but have now permanently left the club:

Source: Sky Sports

Top scorers

1Mowatt left the club on 27 January 2017.

Disciplinary record
Last Updated: 7 May 2017

1Bamba left club on 1 September 2016.
2Mowatt left club on 27 January 2017.

Suspensions served
As of 29 April 2017

References

Leeds United
Leeds United F.C. seasons
Foot